Tatyana Polovinskaya (born March 14, 1965, in Simferopol, Ukrainian SSR) is a retired long-distance runner from Ukraine, who represented the Soviet Union in the women's marathon at the 1988 Summer Olympics in Seoul, South Korea, finishing in fourth place. Her mark (2:27:05) stand as a national record for nearly eighteen years. It was broken on March 26, 2006, by Tetyana Hladyr in Rome, Italy: 2:25:44.

Achievements
All results regarding marathon, unless stated otherwise

References
 Ukraine record progression
 Year Rankings
 sports-reference

1965 births
Living people
Ukrainian female long-distance runners
Soviet female long-distance runners
Athletes (track and field) at the 1988 Summer Olympics
Olympic athletes of the Soviet Union
Sportspeople from Simferopol